Ribadeo Fútbol Club is a Spanish football team based in Ribadeo, Province of Lugo, in the autonomous community of Galicia. Founded in 1940 it currently plays in Tercera División – Group 1, holding home games at Estadio Municipal Pepe Barrera, which has a capacity of 2,500 spectators.

The club organises the Trofeo Emma Cuervo, a friendly tournament consisting of football clubs across Galicia.

Season to season

5 seasons in Tercera División

Honours
Preferente Autonómica: 2013–14

External links
Official website 
Futbolme team profile 
Arefe Regional team profile 

Football clubs in Galicia (Spain)
Association football clubs established in 1913
1913 establishments in Spain